William Warwick Johnson (born 18 March 1974 in Solihull) is a rugby union footballer who plays at Number 8 for RC Nice in France.

He is perhaps best known for being Martin Johnson's younger brother, but yet played over 200 times for Leicester and gained a number of caps for England 'A'.  A good club man, known for technique and work rate, Johnson started the epic 2001 Heineken Cup Final against Stade Francais, breaking his arm and being replaced by Paul Gustard. The following year he was an unused replacement as Leicester retained the trophy. Johnson played seven times for England A but never made the break through to international level, in a similar fashion to another Leicester back rower John Wells.

Johnson joined Coventry R.F.C. in July 2006 and was made club captain, but left in December of that year to join Italian side Benetton Treviso. Since then he has moved on to captain Rugby Nice Côte d'Azur where he plays alongside Dan Luger and Kevin Yates.

References

External links 
 Official RNCA page
 scrum.com statistics
 Will Johnson Website

1974 births
Living people
English rugby union players
People from Market Harborough
Rugby union players from Leicestershire
Leicester Tigers players
Rugby Nice Côte d'Azur players
Rugby union players from Solihull
Rugby union number eights
English expatriate rugby union players
Expatriate rugby union players in Italy
Expatriate rugby union players in France
Benetton Rugby players
English expatriate sportspeople in Italy
English expatriate sportspeople in France